Lecythis serrata is a species of woody plant in the family Lecythidaceae. It is found only in Brazil. It is threatened by habitat loss.

References

serrata
Flora of Brazil
Near threatened plants
Taxonomy articles created by Polbot